Crveni Krst (translated: Red Cross) is one of five city municipalities which constitute the city of Niš. According to the 2011 census, the municipality has a population of 32,301 inhabitants.

Geography
The municipality borders Aleksinac municipality in the north-west, Svrljig municipality in the north-east, Pantelej municipality in the east, Medijana municipality in the south-east, Palilula municipality in the south, and Merošina municipality in the south-west.

History
Crveni Krst Municipality was formed on 6 June 2002. It was the site of a concentration camp during World War II.

Demographics
According to the 2011 census, the municipality had a population of 32,301 inhabitants, with 12,516 in the eponymous settlement.

Settlements 
The municipality consists of 24 settlements, all of which are classified as rural, except for Crveni Krst, which is a part of a larger urban settlement of Niš.

Neighborhoods 
Neighborhoods of municipality of Crveni Krst include:

 Crveni Krst
 Beograd Mala
 Jagodin Mala (partly)
 Šljaka
 Komren (mostly)
 Ratko Jović

See also
 Subdivisions of Serbia
 Niš

References

External links

Municipalities of Niš